Judit Ignacio Sorribes (born 18 March 1994) is a Spanish swimmer who competes in the women's 100-metre butterfly. At the 2012 Summer Olympics, she finished tied for 26th overall in the heats in the women's 100-metre butterfly and failed to reach the final.

References

1994 births
Living people
Olympic swimmers of Spain
Swimmers at the 2012 Summer Olympics
Swimmers at the 2016 Summer Olympics
Spanish female butterfly swimmers
Swimmers at the 2010 Summer Youth Olympics
21st-century Spanish women